Iridium(V) fluoride, IrF5, is a chemical compound of iridium and fluorine. A highly reactive yellow low melting solid, it has a tetrameric structure, Ir4F20, which contains octahedrally coordinated iridium atoms. This structure is shared with RuF5 and OsF5. It can be prepared by the controlled decomposition of IrF6 or the reduction of IrF6 with silicon powder or H2 in anhydrous HF.

2 IrF6+H2->2 IrF5+2 HF

See also
 Iridium(VI) fluoride
 Iridium(IV) fluoride

References

Iridium compounds
Fluorides
Platinum group halides